Sri Pratap College, commonly known as SP College, is an academic and professional college in Srinagar, Jammu and Kashmir, India. The college has been accredited by NAAC with an 'A' Grade. It is the oldest institute of higher education in the Kashmir Valley.

Location
It is located in the heart of summer capital of the Indian union territory of Jammu and Kashmir, i. e., Srinagar, at M.A. Road, Srinagar.

History

Established in 1905 by Annie Besant for the then ruler of Jammu and Kashmir Shri Maharaja Pratap Singh. Before Indian independence, the college was affiliated with University of Punjab and post independence Banaras Hindu University gave affiliation to S.P. college until the University of Kashmir was founded in 1956. It was established in 1905, as an intermediate college by upgrading the famous Hindu High School, Srinagar. It was the personal effort of notable British Social Reformer and educationist, Annie Besant who directed the Central Hindu College Trust, Banaras(to which it was affiliated) to appoint, Mr M.U. Moore, a noted Irish Scholar as the first principal of the institution. Beginning with a modest roll of eight students and only six teachers on its staff, in a few years' time, the college rose to the degree level in Arts by 1911 when state government took it over and renamed it as Sri Pratap College after the name of the then ruler of the state Maharaja Pratap Singh. In 1912 the college was affiliated to the University of Punjab, Lahore with the state patronage available to it by virtue of which the growth of S.P College received a notable fillip. Ever since, the development of the college has been a steady process through the entire span of the 20th century. 
 
During the tenure of Prof. I.K Sharga (1911–1921) the science stream up to intermediate level was introduced in the college curriculum. The dynamic and ablest academics and administrators like Prof. M.U. Moore, Prof. Vinamali Chakaravati, Prof. I.K. Sharga, Prof. Lawrence Mac Dermot, Prof. M.M. Ibrahim, Dr. M. D. Taseer, Prof. Jia Lal Kaul and Prof. Saif ud Din have served the college and contributed to the level that the hundreds of the college alumni rose to eminence in different fields of human activity in the state and outside,  by occupying important positions.

The college has celebrated its centenary year in 2005, and in this year people from the world participated in the college function, as the different departments of the college organized different workshops and exhibitions.

The history of S.P College is, in-fact, the history of progress of higher education in Kashmir. Almost for the first half of the 20th century, S.P. College had the distinction of being the only institution to provide facilities for imparting higher education in Arts and Sciences in the valley. Despite a good number of colleges coming into existence in the valley after 1947, this college continues to maintain its primacy and academic excellence all along. With the delinking of arts faculty from it in 1975, S.P. College is now an exclusively science college imparting science education at Undergraduate level in a broad spectrum of subjects like English, Chemistry, Botany, Zoology, Environment and Water Management, Biochemistry, Clinical Biochemistry, Biotechnology, Bioinformatics, Human Genetics, Mathematics, Statistics, Physics, Geology, Geography, Electronics, Information Technology. The college also offers add-on course in Spoken Arabic, Environmental Sciences, Communicative English, Personality Development, Physical Education, Diagnostic Lab Technology etc. The college also offers Postgraduate level programmes in various science subjects.

The institute has been declared as a part of the Cluster University of Srinagar under the Rashtriya Uchchatar Shiksha Abhiyan. The institute shall run School of Sciences under this initiative offering more postgraduate as well as research intensive programmes.  With operationalization of the school of Sciences under RUSA cluster University proposal, research is expected to get a flip with more funding coming for the purpose. The infrastructure for this project is being funded by Central Government and is coming-up at brisk pace. The school is likely to start from 2017.

It is worth to mention that the college got submerged in the September 2014 deluge. This resulted in huge loss of infrastructure, labs, some 60,000 books, and other support facilities.

Courses
The college offers a range of nationally and internationally recognized undergraduate and postgraduate programmes in a variety of academic disciplines including Science and Information Technology. It is recognized by the University Grants Commission of India, (UGC). It is affiliated to University of Kashmir. The college offers following courses:
Five-Year (Integrated) M.Sc. in Physics
Five-Year (Integrated) M.Sc. in Zoology
Five-Year (Integrated) M.Sc. in Chemistry
Five-Year (Integrated) M.Sc. in Environmental Science
Five-Year (Integrated) M.Sc. in Information Technology
Five-Year (Integrated) M.Sc. in Water Resources & Waste Water Technology
Five-Year (Integrated) M.Sc. in Botany
Six-Semester based B.Sc. (Hons) in Physics
Six-Semester based B.Sc. (Hons) in Mathematics
Six-Semester based B.Sc. (Hons) in Statistics
Six-Semester based B.Sc. (Hons) in Geology
Six-Semester based B.Sc. (Hons) in I.T
Six-Semester based B.Sc. (Hons) in Botany
Six-Semester based B.Sc. (Hons) in Zoology
Six-Semester based B.Sc. (Hons) in Chemistry
Six-Semester based B.Sc. (Hons) in Biochemistry
Six-Semester based B.Sc. (Hons) in Water Resources & Waste Water Technology
Six-Semester based B.Sc. (Hons) in Electronics
Six-Semester based B.Sc. (Hons) in Geography
Six-Semester based B.Sc. (Hons) in Biotechnology
Six-Semester based B.Sc. (Hons) in Biochemistry
Six-Semester based B.Sc. (Hons) in Bioinformatics
Six-Semester based B.Sc. (Hons) in Clinical Biochemistry

Departments
Department of English
PG Department of Biochemistry
Department of Biotechnology
PG Department of Botany
PG Department of Chemistry
Department of Electronics
Department of Environment and Water Management
PG Department of Environmental Sciences
Department of Geography
Department of Geology
PG Department of Information Technology
Department of Mathematics
PG Department of Physics
Department of Physical Education
Department of Statistics
PG Department of Zoology
Department of Human Genetics
Department of Bio Informatics
Department of Clinical Biochemistry

IGNOU Study Centre: S.P. College IGNOU Study Centre (1209) is steaming ahead since its inception in 2004. At present, the centre provides counselling and guidance to number of UG and PG courses. During the current year, the student enrolment has touched 4000 making an increase of staggering 90% and the number of programmes offered has also risen to 39. This centre has a distinction of holding practical sessions for students in all science streams and conducting all types of examinations. This centre also holds distinction in actuating highly market oriented courses in PG Analytical Chemistry, GIS & Remote Sensing, etc.

Postage stamp

On 15 June 2006, India Post released a commemorative postage stamp on Sri Pratap College. The stamp depicted the heritage building of the college.

Notable alumni
 Amanullah Khan
 Karan Singh
 Mirza Hassan Khan
 Rafiq Ahmad Pampori
 Ramanand Sagar
 Rehman Rahi
 Mufti Mohammad Sayeed
 Om Prakash Malhotra
 Sheikh Abdullah
 Yasin Malik
 Ashfaq Majeed Wani

References

External links
 S P College Website

Colleges in India
Degree colleges in Kashmir Division
Universities and colleges in Srinagar
Universities and colleges in Jammu and Kashmir
Colleges affiliated to University of Kashmir
Colleges affiliated to Cluster University of Srinagar